Thomas Robert Browne, FKC (15 June 1889 – 13 August 1978) was  Archdeacon of Ipswich from 1946  until 1963.

After a curacy in Tottenham he held incumbencies at Edwardstone, Earl Soham, Newmarket,  Elmsett and Shotley. He was an honorary canon at St Edmundsbury Cathedral from 1936 to 1946.

References

1889 births
20th-century English Anglican priests
Alumni of King's College London
Fellows of King's College London
Archdeacons of Ipswich
Dorset Regiment officers
1978 deaths